All That Echoes is the sixth studio album by American singer-songwriter Josh Groban, produced by Rob Cavallo. The album debuted at number one on the Billboard 200, selling 145,000 copies in its first week. The album has sold 532,000 copies in the United States as of April 2015.

Background
On November 18, 2012, the album was announced, revealing the cover art, title, and date of release: February 5, 2013. It was available for preorder through retailer Amazon.com on November 27. Groban has recorded cover songs by Stevie Wonder and Glen Hansard for the album. The first track, "Brave", was released as a single on December 18, 2012. Groban promoted the album with the All That Echoes World Tour.

Track listing

Personnel
 Josh Groban – vocals, piano, e-bow, additional drums
 Curt Bisquera – drums
 Chris Chaney – bass guitar
 Tim Pierce – guitar
 Ramon Stagnaro – acoustic guitar, charango
 Carlos del Puerto – bass guitar
 Arturo Sandoval – trumpet
 Walter Afanasieff – piano
 Paul Bushnell – bass guitar
 Luis Conte – percussion
 Matt Chamberlain – drums
 Eleanore Choate – harp
 Sean Hurley – bass guitar
 Jamie Muhoberac – keyboards, piano
 Abe Laboriel Jr. – drums, percussion
 Rob Cavallo – acoustic guitar, piano, additional bass guitar
 Dan Chase – drum programming, synthesizer
 André Manga – bass guitar
 Eric Rigler – bagpipes, low whistle
 Lester Mendez – synthesizer, programming

Charts

Weekly charts

Year-end charts

Certifications

References

External links
 
 

2013 albums
Josh Groban albums
Reprise Records albums
143 Records albums
Albums produced by Rob Cavallo